Panormus or Panormos was an ancient Greek harbor settlement mentioned by the geographer Ptolemy, in Chaonia in ancient Epirus, situated nearly midway between Oricum and Onchesmus. Strabo describes it as a great harbour in the midst of the Ceraunian Mountains. 

It site is possibly located at Porto Palermo south of Himare, Albania. Borsh, Albania has also been suggested as a possible site.

See also
List of cities in ancient Epirus

References 

Cities in ancient Epirus
Populated places in ancient Epirus
Former populated places in the Balkans
Lost ancient cities and towns